Pot  is a novel by Slovenian author and climber  (1952-1983). It was first published in Ljubljana, then part of Yugoslavia, in 1981. The book narrates, in a novelized way, Zaplotnik's life and experiences as an alpinist in postwar Slovenia, culminating in the ascension of both Makalu and Everest.

See also
List of Slovenian novels

Slovenian novels
1981 novels